Duke Ellington & John Coltrane is a jazz album by Duke Ellington and John Coltrane released in January 1963 on Impulse! Records.

It was one of Ellington's many collaborations in the early 1960s with musicians such as Count Basie, Louis Armstrong, Coleman Hawkins, Max Roach, and Charles Mingus, and placed him with a quartet (in this case, saxophone, piano, bass, and drums), rather than a big band. The quartet was filled out by the bassist and drummer from either of their bands. The album featured Ellington standards (e.g., "In a Sentimental Mood"), new Ellington compositions, and a new Coltrane composition ("Big Nick").

Coltrane said:I was really honored to have the opportunity of working with Duke. It was a wonderful experience. He has set standards I haven't caught up with yet. I would have liked to have worked over all those numbers again, but then I guess the performances wouldn't have had the same spontaneity. And they mightn't have been any better!

Track listing

Personnel
 Duke Ellington - piano
 John Coltrane - tenor saxophone (all but track 3) and soprano saxophone (track 3)
 Jimmy Garrison - bass (tracks 2, 3, and 6)
 Aaron Bell - bass (tracks 1, 4, 5 and 7)
 Elvin Jones - drums (tracks 1-3 and 6)
 Sam Woodyard - drums (tracks 4-5 and 7)

Charts

References

1963 albums
John Coltrane albums
Duke Ellington albums
Impulse! Records albums
Albums produced by Bob Thiele
Collaborative albums
Albums recorded at Van Gelder Studio